Noyon is a sum (district) of Ömnögovi Province in southern Mongolia. In 2009, its population was 1,318.

Notable people
 

Dulamyn Puntsag, former judge of the Supreme Court of Mongolia

References 

Districts of Ömnögovi Province